The Minister for Justice is a position in the Luxembourgian cabinet.  Among other competences, the Minister for Justice is responsible for prisons, extradition, gambling, and the smooth operation of the judiciary.

The position of Minister for Justice has been in continuous existence since the promulgation of Luxembourg's first constitution, in 1848.  Originally, justice was within the remit of the Administrator-General for Foreign Affairs, Justice, and Religion (Administrateur général des Affaires étrangères, de la Justice et des Cultes), but justice was separated from this office on 23 September 1853.

Since 24 March 1936, the title of Minister for Justice has been an official one, although the position had been unofficially known by that name since its creation.  From the position's creation until 28 November 1857, the Minister went by the title of Administrator-General.  From 1857 until 1936, the Minister went by the title of Director-General.

List of Ministers for Justice

Footnotes

References
 
  

 List
Justice, Minister for